Duncan Public Schools is a public school district located in Stephens County, Oklahoma. The district includes 10 school sites.

History
At the time of Oklahoma statehood in 1907, Stephens County had only 20 common schools and three high schools, but by the 1930s there were 65 school districts, including the independent school district of Duncan.

List of schools

Primary schools
 Emerson Elementary
 Plato Elementary
 Horace Mann Elementary
 Mark Twain Elementary
 Woodrow Wilson Elementary
 Will Rogers Pre-K

Secondary schools
 Duncan Middle School
 Duncan High School

Alternative Education
 E.D.G.E. Academy

References

School districts in Oklahoma
Education in Stephens County, Oklahoma